The Life That I Want is a 2004 Italian drama film directed by Giuseppe Piccioni. It was entered into the 27th Moscow International Film Festival.

Cast
 Luigi Lo Cascio as Stefano / Federico
 Sandra Ceccarelli as Laura / Eleonora
 Galatea Ranzi as Chiara / Vittoria
 Fabio Camilli as Raffaele
 Antonino Bruschetta as Luca (as Ninni Bruschetta)
 Roberto Citran as Giordani
 Camilla Filippi as Monica
 Paolo Sassanelli as Diego
 Gea Lionello as Marina
 Sasa Vulicevic as Luciano / Conte

See also 
 List of Italian films of 2004

References

External links
 

2004 films
2004 drama films
Italian drama films
2000s Italian-language films
Films directed by Giuseppe Piccioni
2000s Italian films